Tashvir Rural District is in Gilvan District of Tarom County, Zanjan province, Iran. After the 2016 National Census, Gilvan Rural District (formerly of the Central District) was elevated to the status of a district and divided into two rural districts, with the village of Tashvir as the capital of Tashvir Rural District. The village had a population of 1,249 people at the census of 2016.

References 

Tarom County

Rural Districts of Zanjan Province

Populated places in Zanjan Province

Populated places in Tarom County

fa:دهستان تشویر